Giuseppe Castiglione (1829–1908) was an Italian artist known for genre paintings and portraits.

Castiglione was born in Naples, Italy. He moved to Paris early in his career and is thought to have studied painting there. He started exhibiting his paintings in Paris and Turin. He was a member of the Sociétaire des Artistes and was awarded honorable mention at the 1861 Salon exhibition. He was awarded a medal at the Salon exhibition of 1869.  At the Exposition Universelle of 1900, Castiglione was awarded a bronze medal. He was decorated with the Légion d’honneur in 1893.

He played chess.

Works

These include:
Le Salon Carré, 1861, 69 x 103 cm, Louvre museum, Paris
Visiting the Cardinal Uncle, Philadelphia Exposition, 1876, medal
The Warrants, 1876
The Terrace of the Palace Royal at Naples, Paris, 1877
A Duel Without Witnesses, Paris, 1877
Portrait of Pandolfini of the Theater des Italians, 1878
Lesson to the Paroquet, 1878
A View of Haddon Hall, England, Invaded by Soldiers of Cromwell, Paris Exposition 1878
The Introduction
The Three Musketeers, VerzamelaarsVeiling oktober 2017 
On the River at Dusk

Notes and references

External links
"Giuseppe Castiglione, (1829–1908)", Lawrence J. Cantor & Company.
"Lost in Reverie by The Bay of Naples" The Athenaeum
The Louvre, Paris
Comma International Oil Painting Arts Inc
"The portrait" Artfact

1829 births
1908 deaths
19th-century Italian painters
Italian male painters
20th-century Italian painters
Recipients of the Legion of Honour
19th-century Italian male artists
20th-century Italian male artists